Damien Robinson (born December 22, 1973) is a former safety of the NFL. He played for the Tampa Bay Buccaneers, New York Jets, and Seattle Seahawks. He attended college at the University of Iowa.

Professional career

Philadelphia Eagles
The Eagles drafted Robinson in the 4th round of the 1997 NFL Draft.  Represented by Dr Glenn Toby and Jimmy Gould

Tampa Bay Buccaneers
On September 18, 1997, the Buccaneers signed Robinson off of the Eagles practice squad. During the 2000 NFL season, Robinson was one of the league's leading Free Safeties with 6 interceptions and 11 passes.  Robinson was the starting free safety for the Tampa Bay Buccaneers.  The number one defense in the NFL known for the Tampa 2 defense.  Robinson was known for his ball hawking and hard hitting skills.

New York Jets
Robinson signed to the N.Y. Jets in 2001 as one of the top free agents on the market.  Robinson is best known for the November 4, 2001 event at the Louisiana Superdome. His Jets were leading the New Orleans Saints, 16-9, late in the ball game. After a routine offensive play, Robinson grabbed the face mask of Saints quarterback Aaron Brooks and continually pulled at the mask, bending Brooks backwards and twisting his neck. Saints offensive lineman Kyle Turley was furious, and attacked Robinson.  It was a team scuffle as referees and players from both teams tried to separate them.  Robinson knocked Turley's helmet off.  Turley emerged from the ensuing scrum with Robinson's helmet and flung it across the field before making an obscene gesture. Turley later was fined $20,000 by the NFL for his actions.  Robinson stayed in the game which was subsequently won by the Jets.

Seattle Seahawks
On March 11, 2003, Robinson signed a multi-year contract with the Seahawks. In 2003, he played in 15 games, starting 4. He spent the 2004 season on injured reserve with a shoulder injury. On March 3, 2005, he was released from his contract.

References

Living people
1973 births
Players of American football from Dallas
Hillcrest High School (Dallas) alumni
American football safeties
Tampa Bay Buccaneers players
New York Jets players
Seattle Seahawks players
Iowa Hawkeyes football players